Vidmantas Bartulis (3 April 1954 – 30 January 2020) was a Lithuanian composer, and a recipient of the Lithuanian National Prize (1998).

Bartulis's works include Missa brevis and the oratorio Nelaimelis Jobas (2003).

References

External links
Discography 

1954 births
2020 deaths
Lithuanian composers
Recipients of the Lithuanian National Prize
Musicians from Kaunas
Male composers
20th-century composers
21st-century composers
20th-century Lithuanian male musicians
21st-century Lithuanian male musicians